Georg Quedens (born 1934 in Norddorf) is a German photographer and non-fiction writer as well as a local and natural historian.

Life and work
Quedens has been living on the island of Amrum since he was born, and so his work has been influenced by the nature and history of the island. Since 1961, when his first photo-book was published, he has written more than 50 books about Amrum and other North Frisian islands. He is a regular contributor to the regional newspaper of Amrum and Föhr, Der Insel-Bote, but his photographs have been used by calendars and magazines on a national scale in Germany.

Quedens moreover holds public lectures on the North Sea region on a regular base and has been editing an annual chronicle of Amrum since 1983.

Reception, awards and decorations
A documentary film about the life and work of Georg Quedens was shown in 1999 at the Lübeck Nordic Film Days.

Quedens was awarded the 2004 Hans Momsen Prize for merits on the cultural life in Nordfriesland district. In 2009, the Minister President of Schleswig-Holstein, Peter Harry Carstensen, decorated him with the cross of the Order of Merit of the Federal Republic of Germany.

Selected works

Further reading

References

1934 births
Living people
German botanical writers
German chroniclers
Photographers from Schleswig-Holstein
German naturalists
Recipients of the Cross of the Order of Merit of the Federal Republic of Germany
North Frisians
Frisian writers
German male non-fiction writers
Amrum
German Frisians